Graeme Reid is a South African scholar and activist who is the director of the LGBT rights program at Human Rights Watch. He has also written two books: Real Gay: Gay Identities in small-town South Africa and Above the Skyline. Some of his written works have been published in scholarly journals and as chapters of a book.

Reid was born in Johannesburg and attended University of Witwatersrand where he received his bachelor's and master's degree. He was the coordinator of the Gay and Lesbian Archives in South Africa and then worked as a researcher with the Institute for Social and Economic Research at his alma mater.

Reid co-directed the documentary film, Dark and Lovely, Soft and Free for the Gay and Lesbian Archives in 2000.

References

Year of birth missing (living people)
Living people
University of the Witwatersrand alumni
South African LGBT rights activists